Bertrand is a village in Phelps County, Nebraska, United States. The population was 750 at the 2010 census.

History
Bertrand was established in 1884 when the railroad was extended to that point. It was named for a railroad official. Bertrand was incorporated as a village in 1885.

Geography
Bertrand is located at  (40.525739, -99.633458).

Demographics

2010 census
As of the census of 2010, there were 750 people, 314 households, and 203 families residing in the village. The racial makeup of the village was 97.7% White, 0.5% Native American, 0.4% Asian, 0.3% from other races, and 1.1% from two or more races. Hispanic or Latino of any race were 2.9% of the population.

There were 314 households, of which 28.7% had children under the age of 18 living with them, 58.0% were married couples living together, 4.8% had a female householder with no husband present, 1.9% had a male householder with no wife present, and 35.4% were non-families. 33.1% of all households were made up of individuals, and 19.8% had someone living alone who was 65 years of age or older. The average household size was 2.32 and the average family size was 2.98.

The median age in the village was 46.9 years. 24.8% of residents were under the age of 18; 3.7% were between the ages of 18 and 24; 18.1% were from 25 to 44; 31.5% were from 45 to 64; and 21.9% were 65 years of age or older. The gender makeup of the village was 49.5% male and 50.5% female.

2000 census
As of the census of 2000, there were 786 people, 307 households, and 201 families residing in the village. The population density was 1,391.7 people per square mile (541.9/km2). There were 334 housing units at an average density of 591.4 per square mile (230.3/km2). The racial makeup of the village was 98.85% White, 0.13% African American, 0.38% Native American, 0.25% Asian, 0.38% from other races. Hispanic or Latino of any race were 0.76% of the population.

There were 307 households, out of which 33.2% had children under the age of 18 living with them, 58.3% were married couples living together, 4.2% had a female householder with no husband present, and 34.5% were non-families. 30.3% of all households were made up of individuals, and 19.2% had someone living alone who was 65 years of age or older. The average household size was 2.45 and the average family size was 3.07.

In the village, the population was spread out, with 25.3% under the age of 18, 5.6% from 18 to 24, 24.4% from 25 to 44, 22.9% from 45 to 64, and 21.8% who were 65 years of age or older. The median age was 42 years. For every 100 females, there were 98.5 males. For every 100 females age 18 and over, there were 92.5 males.

As of 2000 the median income for a household in the village was $34,167, and the median income for a family was $44,205. Males had a median income of $28,646 versus $22,083 for females. The per capita income for the village was $16,933. About 2.0% of families and 3.9% of the population were below the poverty line, including none of those under age 18 and 13.0% of those age 65 or over.

Notable person
 Ben H. Williams, American labor leader known for his work in the Industrial Workers of the World and as editor of Solidarity.

References

External links 

Historical images of Bertrand – Nebraska Memories

Villages in Phelps County, Nebraska
Villages in Nebraska